Rudi A Hydropower Station is a run-of-river hydro-electric plant located in the Kaski District of Nepal that came into operation in 2019. The flow from the Rudi River is used to generate 8.8 MW electricity.

Location and water supply

The others are the Midim, Paste, Birdi, Khalte, Pisti, Risti, Sange and Kalesti.
The river's discharge is highest between mid-April and mid-December, when there is most rain, with less water from mid-December to mid-April.

There are two run-of-the-river hydroelectricity plants on the river operated by Bindhyabasini Hydropower Development Company Limited (BHDCL).
The 8.8 MW Rudi Khola-A is in Mijuredanda VDC of Kaski District.
The 6.6 MW Rudi Khola-B is just upstream in Pasguan VDC, Lamjung District.

Construction

High Himalayan Hydro Construction Pvt Ltd undertook civil construction, while North Hydro and Engineering was responsible to hydro mechanical construction and Toshiba Plant System and Service Corporation undertook the electro-mechanical construction.

In September 2016 work on Rudi A and Rudi B was halted due to floods and landslides.
The main storage site of Rudi A was washed away, and the powerhouse had to be relocated.
In July 2018 flooding again caused serious damage to the Rudi Khola A hydropower project, which was under construction.
The penstock pipe was destroyed and the recently completed road was badly damaged.
The project was almost complete, including construction of the powerhouse, electromechanical connection of the turbine and generator, headworks and transmission line.

Trial power generation from Rudi A began in September 2018.
The project began commercial operation on 19 May 2019. 
Total costs were Rs. 1,555 million, with a debt-equity ration of 68:32.

Technology

Rudi A was initially developed as a 6.8MW run-of-the-river hydroelectricity project.
Later this was changed to become a tailrace project of Rudi-B.
This created greater hydraulic head and volume from the Chhedewa Khola and Rudi Khola to the head pond near Rudi B.
The catchment was now .
The design was upgraded to 8.8MW with  net head and  discharge at Q40%.

Water is carried  to the Rudi A powerhouse from Kaski's Singdi Basin and Lamjung's Singdi Dam.
Components include the intake,  reinforced concrete approach culvert, head pond,  headrace pipe, surge tank,  penstock connecting the surge tank to the powerhouse, and  tailrace canal.
They power two horizontal 3 phase AC synchronous brushless excitation generators, each with rated voltage of 6.3 kV.

Power from Rudi B is carried on a  33kV transmission line to the Rudi A switchyard.
Power from Rudi A is carried on a  33kV transmission line to Nepal Electricity Authority's substation at Mijuredanda.
The variable flow means the power supply varies seasonally.

Commercial arrangements

The plant is owned and developed by Bindhabasini Hydropower Development Company Pvt.Ltd. (BHDCL), an Independent Power Producer of Nepal.
BHDCL has a 30-year power purchase agreement with Nepal Electricity Authority (NEA) with contracted energy of 46,860,000 units for Rudi A and 33,210,000 units for Rudi B.
Higher tariffs apply in the dry season than the wet season.

The generation licence will expire in 2105-09-11 BS, after which the plant will be handed over to the government.  
The power station is connected to the national grid and the electricity is sold to Nepal Electricity Authority.

See also
List of power stations in Nepal

References

Sources

 

Hydroelectric power stations in Nepal
Gravity dams
Run-of-the-river power stations
Dams in Nepal
Irrigation in Nepal
2019 establishments in Nepal
Buildings and structures in Kaski District